These are the list of personnel changes in the NBA from the 1960–61 NBA season.

Events

August 20, 1960
 The Los Angeles Lakers hired Fred Schaus as head coach.

September 21, 1960
 The New York Knicks sold Cal Ramsey to the Syracuse Nationals.

September 22, 1960
 The St. Louis Hawks sold Dave Gambee to the Syracuse Nationals.

October 17, 1960
 The Philadelphia Warriors traded Ernie Beck and Woody Sauldsberry to the St. Louis Hawks for Ed Conlin and cash.

October 24, 1960
 The Los Angeles Lakers signed Gary Alcorn as a free agent.

November 14, 1960
 The New York Knicks] sold Mike Farmer to the Cincinnati Royals.

November 28, 1960
 The St. Louis Hawks sold Ernie Beck to the Syracuse Nationals.
 The Cincinnati Royals sold Phil Rollins to the St. Louis Hawks.

December 15, 1960
 The Los Angeles Lakers waived Gary Alcorn.
 The Detroit Pistons sold Ron Johnson to the Los Angeles Lakers.

December 17, 1960
 The St. Louis Hawks sold Phil Rollins to the New York Knicks.

January 18, 1961
 The Cincinnati Royals sold Phil Jordon to the New York Knicks.

February 23, 1961
 The Chicago Packers hired Jim Pollard as head coach.

March 23, 1961
 Neil Johnston resigns as head coach for Philadelphia Warriors.

April 26, 1961
 The Chicago Packers drafted Dave Budd from the New York Knicks in the NBA expansion draft.
 The Chicago Packers drafted Barney Cable from the Syracuse Nationals in the NBA expansion draft.
 The Chicago Packers drafted Gene Conley from the Boston Celtics in the NBA expansion draft.
 The Chicago Packers drafted Ralph Davis from the Cincinnati Royals in the NBA expansion draft.
 The Chicago Packers drafted Archie Dees from the Detroit Pistons in the NBA expansion draft.
 The Chicago Packers drafted Andy Johnson from the Philadelphia Warriors in the NBA expansion draft.
 The Chicago Packers drafted Dave Piontek from the St. Louis Hawks in the NBA expansion draft.
 The Chicago Packers drafted Slick Leonard from the Los Angeles Lakers in the NBA expansion draft.

May 8, 1961
 The New York Knicks waived Carl Braun.
 The New York Knicks fired Carl Braun as head coach.
 The New York Knicks hired Eddie Donovan as head coach.

May 14, 1961
 The Boston Celtics signed Carl Braun as a free agent.

May 16, 1961
 The New York Knicks sold Sam Stith to the Cincinnati Royals.
 The New York Knicks traded Bob McNeill and Charlie Tyra to the Chicago Packers for Dave Budd.
 The Chicago Packers sold Bob McNeill to the Philadelphia Warriors.
 The Cincinnati Royals sold Sam Stith to the New York Knicks.

May 31, 1961
 The Philadelphia Warriors sold Vern Hatton to the Chicago Packers.

June 18, 1961
 The St. Louis Hawks signed Joe Buckhalter as a free agent.

June 21, 1961
 The Los Angeles Lakers signed Bob Sims as a free agent.

June 22, 1961
 The Chicago Packers signed George Bon Salle as a free agent.

June 24, 1961
 The St. Louis Hawks traded Horace Walker to the Chicago Packers for a 1962 4th round draft pick (Chico Vaughn was later selected).

June 25, 1961
 The St. Louis Hawks traded Joe Buckhalter to the Cincinnati Royals for a future draft pick.

References
NBA Transactions at NBA.com
1960-61 NBA Transactions| Basketball-Reference.com

Transactions
NBA transactions